The 1982 Alberta general election was held on November 2, 1982, to elect members of the Legislative Assembly of Alberta.

Less than four years had passed since the Progressive Conservatives won their landslide victory in 1979.  Premier Peter Lougheed decided to call a snap election to catch fledgling new parties off guard, most notably the separatist Western Canada Concept which was capitalizing on anger over Lougheed's perceived weakness in dealings with the federal government, in particular his acceptance of the hugely unpopular National Energy Program.  The WCC's Gordon Kesler had won a by-election earlier in the year, and Lougheed decided that it would be wise to stage a showdown with the WCC sooner rather than later.

Lougheed then proceeded to mount a campaign based largely on scare tactics, warning Albertans angry with Ottawa but yet uneasy with the WCC that they could end up with a separatist government by voting for a separatist party.  Lougheed would also promise to sell the government owned airline Pacific Western Airlines, which the Lougheed government had purchased in 1974. The strategy worked for the Tories, who won their fourth consecutive term in government, and returned to the 62% popular vote level it had attained in the 1975 election. This netted the Tories 75 seats in the legislature—in terms of percentage of seats won, the second-largest majority government in the province's history.  In the process, they reduced the opposition to only four MLAs in total.

The Alberta Liberal Party was punished in the wake of the NEP.  Barely able to field candidates in a third of the ridings, it went down to one of its worst showings in party history.

The Social Credit Party bottomed out after spending a decade in the wilderness after losing power in 1971.    In a harbinger of things to come, Socred leader Robert Curtis Clark returned to the backbench shortly after the 1979 election, and retired from politics in 1981.  Clark's old seat of Olds-Didsbury was resoundingly lost to the WCC in the ensuing by-election, dropping the Socreds to only three seats, one short of official party status.  In March 1982, Socred parliamentary leader Raymond Speaker announced the Socreds would sit out the election.  A resolution was put forward to disband the party, but failed.  After the writs were issued for the 1982 election, two of the remaining three Socred MLAs, Speaker and Walt Buck, resigned from the party to run for reelection as independents.  The third, Fred Mandeville, opted not to run for reelection.  With no incumbents for the first time since 1935 and no full-time leader, the party's share of the popular vote fell from almost 20% to less than one percent. It was shut out of the legislature for the first time since 1935, never to return.  Speaker and Buck, however, did win reelection, and later formed the Representative Party of Alberta after being denied opposition status.

The New Democratic Party, led by Grant Notley, became the official opposition when Ray Martin was elected to the legislature.  Notley had been the sole NDP MLA for more than a decade.

The WCC, a party that advocated the separation of the four western provinces of Canada to form a new country, had surprised Canadians when Kesler won his by-election and took a seat in the Alberta legislature.  Although Kesler lost his seat in this election after he changed electoral districts from Olds-Didsbury and ran in Highwood, the WCC won almost 12% of the popular vote.

The Alberta Reform Movement, a new party founded by ex-Progressive Conservative Tom Sindlinger was caught unaware when the election was called, and ended up losing its only seat in Calgary Buffalo.

Results
Overall voter turnout was 66.00%.

Note:

* Party did not nominate candidates in the previous election.

Results by riding

|-
|Athabasca|||
|Frank Appleby5,34256.96%
|
|Ed Caraher1,95220.81%
|
|Con Sehn1,53816.40%
|
|
|
|Adam Hauch (SoCred)5295.64%|||
|Frank Appleby
|-
|Banff-Cochrane|||
|Greg Stevens8,36972.06%
|
|David Evans1,28811.09%
|
|Larry Peterson1,91916.52%
|
|
|
||||
|Greg Stevens
|-
|Barrhead|||
|Kenneth R. Kowalski5,00151.37%
|
|Harold E. Wharton4784.91%
|
|John Thomas Mitchell6336.50%
|
|Nicholas Taylor3,33134.22%
|
|Shirley Bassani (SoCred)2402.47%Ernie Charman (ARM)390.40%
||
|Hugh F. Horner
|-
|Bonnyville|||
|Ernie Isley4,84259.43%
|
|Tom Turner2,54731.26%
|
|Eric E. Enns7328.98%
|
|
|
||||
|Ernie Isley
|-
|Bow Valley|||
|Tom N. Musgrove4,54160.06%
|
|Bradley Neubauer2663.52%
|
|
|
|
|
|Murray Erickson (Ind.)2,71935.96%|||
|Fred T. Mandeville
|-
|Calgary-Bow|||
|Neil Webber9,41270.02%
|
|Catherine Martini2,29317.06%
|
|Roy P. Rasmusen1,0597.88%
|
|Floyd Allen3802.83%
|
|Douglas Stewart Williams (SoCred)2531.88%|||
|Neil Webber
|-
|Calgary-Buffalo|||
|Brian Craig Lee7,59162.01%
|
|Barry Pashak1,2119.89%
|
|Anita Bozak7396.04%
|
|
|
|Tom Sindlinger (ARM)264921.64%
||
|Tom Sindlinger
|-
|Calgary-Currie|||
|Dennis L. Anderson9,70175.51%
|
|Glenn Miller1,41711.03%
|
|Darwin M. Sorenson1,0187.92%
|
|Rork Hilford6865.34%
|
||||
|Dennis L. Anderson
|-
|Calgary-Egmont|||
|David John Carter10,33178.18%
|
|Leroy Thompson1,1288.54%
|
|Richard A. Langen1,1748.88%
|
|Bernie C. Tanner3963.00%
|
|Victor Lenko (ARM)1581.20%
||
|Merv Leitch
|-
|Calgary-Elbow|||
|David J. Russell7,52169.64%
|
|Thora Miessner1,0549.76%
|
|Gregory J. Langen8297.68%
|
|John S. Webb6746.24%
|
|Don Carter (Ind.)5204.81%Ray Neilson (SoCred)1721.59%
||
|David J. Russell
|-
|Calgary-Fish Creek|||
|William Edward Payne17,37679.63%
|
|Tom Polmear1,5016.88%
|
|Byron L. Chenger2,25210.32%
|
|Alan D.J. Sopczak6593.02%
|
||||
|William Edward Payne
|-
|Calgary-Foothills|||
|Janet Koper9,70866.92%
|
|Joanne Hedenstrom2,24915.50%
|
|Robert Moyor1,4389.91%
|
|Larry Adorjan5403.72%
|
|Carol Stein (Ind.)5703.93%|||
|Stewart A. McCrae
|-
|Calgary-Forest Lawn|||
|John Zaozirny9,70473.94%
|
|Ken Richmond1,47811.26%
|
|Henry Hein Braeutigam1,2449.48%
|
|J.V.W. Gairy3142.39%
|
|Ella Ayers (SoCred)2942.24%Bruce Potter (Comm)560.43%
||
|John Zaozirny
|-
|Calgary-Glenmore|||
|Hugh L. Planche13,83577.63%
|
|George Yanchula1,5328.60%
|
|Brian McClung1,86410.46%
|
|
|
|Barry J. Rust (ARM)5262.95%
||
|Hugh L. Planche
|-
|Calgary-McCall|||
|Stanley Kenneth Nelson17,49376.40%
|
|Dennis Bennett2,67311.67%
|
|Terry Wolsey1,7287.55%
|
|
|
|Don Bryant (Ind.)8523.72%Grand Tim Majanja (ARM)1200.52%
||
|Andrew Little
|-
|Calgary-McKnight|||
|Eric Charles Musgreave12,13071.54%
|
|Eileen Nesbitt2,45114.46%
|
|John J. Jasienczyk1,3327.86%
|
|John J. Gleason6213.66%
|
|Jerry J. Glowacki (SoCred)3832.26%|||
|Eric Charles Musgreave
|-
|Calgary-Millican|||
|Gordon Wells Shrake6,32368.38%
|
|David Davis Swan1,62617.58%
|
|Garnet E. Birch7798.42%
|
|
|
|Zoritza Kasparian (Ind.)4174.51%Doris Schupp (Comm)500.54%
||
|David John Carter
|-
|Calgary-Mountain View|||
|Bohdan Zip7,18757.43%
|
|Phil Elder3,37226.95%
|
|Stephen B. Keeling7726.17%
|
|J. Curtis Joynt4203.36%
|
|Diane Ablonczy (Ind.)7065.64%|||
|Stan Kushner
|-
|Calgary-North Hill|||
|Ed Oman9,16872.50%
|
|Agnes Middleton1,75313.86%
|
|Gordon Kennard9687.66%
|
|Dorothy Groves7015.54%
|
||||
|Ed Oman
|-
|Calgary-North West|||
|Sheila Embury11,71174.85%
|
|Floyd A. Johnson1,74511.15%
|
|Walter Kostiuk1,76811.30%
|
|
|
|A. Leith McClure (SoCred)4042.58%|||
|Sheila Embury
|-
|Calgary-West|||
|Peter Lougheed11,66878.41%
|
|Ed Smith1,1757.90%
|
|Bruce Roper1,1067.43%
|
|Barbara Ann Scott5984.02%
|
|Leonard Petterson (SoCred)2511.69%|||
|Peter Lougheed
|-
|Camrose|||
|Gordon Stromberg10,54763.53%
|
|Garry Oberg3,07018.49%
|
|Keith Schmidt2,90017.47%
|
|
|
||||
|Gordon Stromberg
|-
|Cardston|||
|John Thompson3,73859.14%
|
|Leslie N. Howard2503.96%
|
|Steve Pinchak2,30936.53%
|
|
|
||||
|John Thompson
|-
|Chinook|||
|Henry Kroeger4,83773.54%
|
|Gladys Creasy4657.07%
|
|Jack Ramsey1,26619.25%
|
|
|
||||
|Henry Kroeger
|-
|Clover Bar
|
|Sten Berg5,43435.67%
|
|David Morris1,68311.05%
|
|Sig Jorstad1,78311.71%
|
||||
|Walt A. Buck (Ind.)6,31241.44%|||
|Walt A. Buck
|-
|Cypress|||
|Alan Hyland4,17064.27%
|
|Rudolf Schempp6379.82%
|
|Gifford Woodcock5909.09%
|
|
|
|Orville Reber (Ind.)1,08016.65%|||
|Alan Hyland
|-
|Drayton Valley|||
|Shirley Cripps4,90666.75%
|
|Lynne Martin1,15515.71%
|
|George Perdicaris1,26517.21%
|
|
|
||||
|Shirley Cripps
|-
|Drumheller|||
|Lewis (Mickey) Clark8,14868.14%
|
|Gerry Hamilton1,1249.40%
|
|Vern Hoff2,63021.99%
|
|
|
||||
|Lewis (Mickey) Clark
|-
|Edmonton-Avonmore|||
|Horst A. Schmid6,60652.92%
|
|Kathleen Wright4,04532.40%
|
|Jake Johnson1,27510.21%
|
|
|
|Leif Oddson (SoCred)4663.73%Rona Drennan (Comm)400.32%
||
|Horst A. Schmid
|-
|Edmonton-Belmont|||
|Walter R. Szwender6,57954.51%
|
|John Younie3,89332.25%
|
|Dennis Peter9868.17%
|
|
|
|Elmer Knutson (Ind.)5124.24%Joan Jenkins (Comm)370.31%
||
|William L. Mack
|-
|Edmonton-Beverly|||
|Bill W. Diachuk6,89450.51%
|
|Winston Gereluk5,63841.31%
|
|Dexter B. Dombro8196.00%
|
|
|
|Steve Kostiuk (SoCred)2681.96%|||
|Bill W. Diachuk
|-
|Edmonton-Calder|||
|Tom Chambers8,44255.31%
|
|Christie Mjolsness5,52736.21%
|
|Walter Stack1,2748.35%
|
|
|
||||
|Tom Chambers
|-
|Edmonton-Centre|||
|Mary LeMessurier5,41449.72%
|
|Iain Taylor3,57832.86%
|
|Larry McIlroy8127.46%
|
|Brian McKercher8497.80%
|
|Lawlor J. McKenna (SoCred)1971.81%|||
|Mary LeMessurier
|-
|Edmonton-Glengarry|||
|Rollie Cook5,99758.38%
|
|Garth Stevenson3,18130.96%
|
|Gordon Reid1,03710.09%
|
|
|
||||
|Rollie Cook
|-
|Edmonton-Glenora|||
|Lou Hyndman7,72461.88%
|
|H.D. (Tony) Smith2,55520.47%
|
|Fred Marshall1,64913.21%
|
|Jerry Paschen5344.28%
|
||||
|Lou Hyndman
|-
|Edmonton-Gold Bar|||
|Alois Paul Hiebert7,22356.65%
|
|Allen Eng3,56327.94%
|
|Joe Wanner9967.81%
|
|Laurie Switzer5674.45%
|
|Chuck Bolton (Ind.)3873.04%|||
|Alois Paul Hiebert
|-
|Edmonton-Highlands|||
|David T. King5,15754.36%
|
|Marilyn Burnett3,49336.82%
|
|Dave Maetche7217.60%
|
|
|
|Naomi J. Rankin (Comm)660.70%
||
|David T. King
|-
|Edmonton-Jasper Place|||
|Leslie Gordon Young6,72357.53%
|
|Don Aitken3,49829.93%
|
|John B. Ludwig9878.45%
|
|
|
|Peter A. Keohan (SoCred)2412.06%G. Crofton (ARM)1791.53%
||
|Leslie Gordon Young
|-
|Edmonton-Kingsway|||
|Carl Paproski4,29441.62%
|
|Alex McEachern3,87937.59%
|
|Curtis Long6696.48%
|
|Bill Broad3183.08%
|
|Mark Byington (Ind.)9509.21%George Klimuk (SoCred)1921.86%|||
|Kenneth R.H. Paproski
|-
|Edmonton-Meadowlark|||
|Gerard Joseph Amerongen10,81758.44%
|
|Robert Henderson4,59024.80%
|
|Al Wilson1,5118.16%
|
|Naseer A. Chaudhary7764.19%
|
|William (Bill) Dickson (Ind.)4232.29%Andy H. Groenink (SoCred)3451.86%|||
|Gerard Joseph Amerongen
|-
|Edmonton-Mill Woods|||
|Milt Pahl10,09555.75%
|
|Gerry Gibeault5,15928.49%
|
|Dave Fletcher1,89410.46%
|
|Winston Mohabir5903.26%
|
|Terry Juba (SoCred)3291.82%|||
|Milt Pahl
|-
|Edmonton-Norwood
|
|Tony Falcone4,78245.25%|||
|Ray Martin4,85745.96%
|
|John Hudson5695.38%
|
|
|
|George J.P. Wowk (SoCred)2632.49%David Wallis (Comm)370.35%
||
|Catherine Chichak
|-
|Edmonton-Parkallen|||
|Neil S. Crawford8,22955.30%
|
|Jim Russell5,77138.78%
|
|Merv Gray8235.53%
|
|
|
|Chris Frazer (Comm)390.26%
||
|Neil S. Crawford
|-
|Edmonton-Sherwood Park|||
|Henry Woo8,40154.70%
|
|Ted Paszek3,46222.54%
|
|Al Oeming3,02919.72%
|
|
|
|Al Howell (ARM)4502.93%
||
|Henry Woo
|-
|Edmonton-Strathcona|||
|Julian Koziak7,10547.73%
|
|Gordon S.B. Wright6,64344.63%
|
|Randy Coombes7434.99%
|
|
|
|Murray W. Scambler (ARM)2791.87%Joe Hill (Comm)640.43%
||
|Julian Koziak
|-
|Edmonton-Whitemud|||
|Keith Alexander10,69658.98%
|
|Leslie Bella4,88426.93%
|
|Erika Guidera1,2096.67%
|
|Philip Lister7914.36%
|
|Joe Trenchy (Ind.)2911.60%Keith Schultz (SoCred)2411.33%|||
|Peter Knaak
|-
|Edson|||
|Ian Reid6,00356.88%
|
|Eilir Thomas3,23230.62%
|
|Lynn Lewis1,28412.17%
|
|
|
||||
|Ian Reid
|-
|Grande Prairie|||
|Bob Elliott9,55558.11%
|
|Bernie Desrosiers3,28019.95%
|
|Jack Smith2,24913.68%
|
|Colin Nash3312.01%
|
|Jake Paetkau (Ind.)5043.06%Roy Housworth (SoCred)4943.00%|||
|Elmer Borstad
|-
|Highwood|||
|Harry E. Alger7,81169.89%
|
|William C. McCutcheon4654.16%
|
|Gordon Kesler2,00617.95%
|
|
|
|Ronald G. Arkes (ARM)1831.64%
||
|George Wolstenholme
|-
|Innisfail|||
|Nigel I. Pengelly6,68470.66%
|
|Lyle B. Bleich7387.80%
|
|George Conway-Brown2,00121.15%
|
|
|
||||
|Nigel I. Pengelly
|-
|Lac La Biche-McMurray|||
|Norman A. Weiss6,84456.74%
|
|Dermond Travis3,48128.86%
|
|Jim Williams1,0218.46%
|
|Roland J. Woodward5844.84%
|
||||
|Norman A. Weiss
|-
|Lacombe|||
|Ron A. Moore5,14161.12%
|
|Glen R. Nelson1,10813.17%
|
|Terry Long1,33915.92%
|
|
|
|Howard P. Thompson (Ind.)8119.64%|||
|John William Cookson
|-
|Lesser Slave Lake|||
|Larry R. Shaben3,15057.48%
|
|Gary D. Kennedy91416.68%
|
|Garth Lodge60711.08%
|
|Joseph D. Blyan4668.50%
|
|George Keay (Ind.)3165.77%|||
|Larry R. Shaben
|-
|Lethbridge-East|||
|Archibald Dick Johnston8,71669.57%
|
|Ed McRae1,36910.93%
|
|Mike Bennison1,0548.41%
|
|John I. Boras9627.68%
|
|Paul R. Belanger (ARM)4003.19%
||
|Archibald Dick Johnston
|-
|Lethbridge-West|||
|John Gogo8,30269.37%
|
|Ian Whishaw1,84415.41%
|
|G.M. Genstad9387.84%
|
|
|
|Jerry Waldern (SoCred)4804.01%Brenda L. Perkins (ARM)3773.15%
||
|John Gogo
|-
|Little Bow
|
|Cliff Wright2,14433.75%
|
|Beth Jantzie1682.64%
|
|Wayne Lawlor85113.40%
|
||||
|Raymond Albert Speaker (Ind.)3,17449.97%
||
|Raymond Albert Speaker
|-
|Lloydminster|||
|James Edgar Miller5,58171.86%
|
|Robin Allan90511.65%
|
|Jerry Butz1,24916.08%
|
|
|
||||
|James Edgar Miller
|-
|Macleod|||
|LeRoy Fjordbotten6,13671.34%
|
|Paul Abilgaard5466.35%
|
|Ellis Oviatt1,29315.03%
|
|Inez Watmough1441.67%
|
||||
|LeRoy Fjordbotten
|-
|Medicine Hat|||
|James Horsman14,65481.20%
|
|Clarence W. Smith2,07211.48%
|
|David F. Lees9965.52%
|
|
|
|Frank F. Cottingham (Ind.)2861.58%|||
|James Horsman
|-
|Olds-Didsbury|||
|Stephen Stiles5,09646.91%
|
|Roy Agnew2332.14%
|
|Daryl M. Jaddock2,71424.98%
|
|
|
||||
|Gordon Kesler
|-
|Peace River|||
|Al (Boomer) Adair4,68856.14%
|
|Richard Collins1,54118.46%
|
|J.A. Jim Kalman1,65719.84%
|
|Laura M. Deedza2112.53%
|
|Joseph (Little Joe) Kessler (Ind.)2252.69%|||
|Al (Boomer) Adair
|-
|Pincher Creek-Crowsnest|||
|Frederick Deryl Bradley4,38864.52%
|
|Mike Cooper1,63624.06%
|
|Dennis Olson6509.56%
|
|Jerry Potts1091.60%
|
||||
|Frederick Deryl Bradley
|-
|Ponoka|||
|Halvar C. Jonson4,03150.65%
|
|C.W. (Bill) Loov87611.01%
|
|Tom Butterfield2,64633.25%
|
|
|
|Paul M. Bateman (ARM)2352.95%Eric Ostergaard (Ind.)1541.94%
||
|Donald J. McCrimmon
|-
|Red Deer|||
|Jim McPherson10,65954.70%
|
|Kendall Dunford1,9159.83%
|
|Wynne Richard Hanson1,4687.53%
|
|
|
|Bob Mills (Ind.)5,39627.69%|||
|Norman F. Magee
|-
|Redwater-Andrew|||
|George Topolnisky4,43850.98%
|
|Steve Leskiw2,50728.80%
|
|Roger P. Pullishy1,12112.88%
|
|Lawrence D. McCallum1571.80%
|
|Michael Senych (Ind.)4675.36%|||
|George Topolnisky
|-
|Rocky Mountain House|||
|John Murray Campbell6,44365.99%
|
|Dolly Martin1,19112.20%
|
|Art Carritt2,11621.67%
|
|
|
||||
|John Murray Campbell
|-
|Smoky River|||
|Marvin Moore3,95057.79%
|
|Anne Hemmingway1,53722.49%
|
|Andrew Blum1,31619.25%
|
|
|
||||
|Marvin Moore
|-
|Spirit River-Fairview
|
|Doug Snider3,26041.61%|||
|Grant W. Notley3,44343.95%
|
|Dan Fletcher1,09313.95%
|
|
|
||||
|Grant W. Notley
|-
|St. Albert|||
|Myrna Fyfe12,98254.60%
|
|Kurt Hoeberg4,43818.67%
|
|Murray Sillito2,46510.37%
|
|
|
|William Ernest Jamison (Ind.)3,40614.33%L.D. Callfas (SoCred)4341.83%|||
|Myrna Fyfe
|-
|St. Paul|||
|John Drobot4,26955.97%
|
|Laurent (Jeff) Dubois2,87237.66%
|
|Iris Bourne4475.86%
|
|
|
||||
|Charles E. Anderson
|-
|Stettler|||
|Graham L. Harle4,91571.40%
|
|Fred J. Rappel6178.96%
|
|Doug Carmichael1,33419.38%
|
|
|
||||
|Graham L. Harle
|-
|Stony Plain|||
|William Frederick Purdy10,21059.73%
|
|Jim Bell2,90516.99%
|
|John G. Parkes2,33713.67%
|
|
|
|Ralph Eikeland (SoCred)2991.75%Murray Fuhr (ARM)2021.18%
||
|William Frederick Purdy
|-
|Taber-Warner|||
|Robert Bogle6,80070.97%
|
|Catherine R. McCreary4865.07%
|
|Ronald Johnson1,81118.90%
|
|
|
|Emil D. Gundlock (ARM)4614.81%
||
|Robert Bogle
|-
|Three Hills|||
|Connie Osterman8,69377.47%
|
|James B. Schleppe5494.89%
|
|Vern Meek1,94917.37%
|
|
|
||||
|Connie Osterman
|-
|Vegreville|||
|John S. Batiuk4,52653.51%
|
|Bob Sarafinchan2,41828.59%
|
|Loren Yasinski8079.54%
|
|
|
|Barry M. Bernard (Ind.)2022.39%Robert E. Robert (SoCred)4875.76%|||
|John S. Batiuk
|-
|Vermilion-Viking|||
|Tom Lysons4,35758.20%
|
|Grant Bergman1,20516.10%
|
|Richard Van Ee1,74223.27%
|
|
|
|Patrick A. Moore (SoCred)1592.12%|||
|Tom Lysons
|-
|Wainwright|||
|Robert A. (Butch) Fischer4,58961.68%
|
|John Wesley Connelly4766.40%
|
|Bill Veitch2,14528.83%
|
|Joseph A. Vermette2182.93%
|
||||
|Charles Stewart
|-
|Wetaskiwin-Leduc|||
|Donald H. Sparrow12,92363.76%
|
|Earl R. Rasmuson3,19015.74%
|
|Bill Hosford3,51117.32%
|
|
|
|Barry Cook (Ind.)5762.84%|||
|Dallas Schmidt
|-
|Whitecourt|||
|Peter Trynchy4,63551.46%
|
|Richard Davies1,22013.55%
|
|Andy Lee2,27625.27%
|
|John M. Powers1471.63%
|
|George L. Richardson (SoCred)6857.61%|||
|Peter Trynchy
|-
|}

See also
List of Alberta political parties

References

Further reading
 

1982
1982 elections in Canada
1982 in Alberta
November 1982 events in Canada